"Big Wheel Cannonball" (title sometimes given as Big Wheel Cannon Ball) is a song written by Vaughn Horton. It follows the same notes as the folk song "Wabash Cannonball" by The Carter Family, but its lyrics eulogise trucks and truckers rather than trains.

It was originally released in 1967 by veteran Canadian singer Dick Todd, backed by the Appalachian Wildcats, on the small Peer-Southern Records label; this was shortly afterwards re-released on a national basis by Decca, and the Decca release rose to number 52 on the Billboard US Country charts, making it Todd's final chart entry.

In 1970 a cover version by American country music artist Dick Curless was released. This made a better chart showing than Todd's original, and also made the Canadian country charts.

Lawton Williams released a further cover in 1971 on his album Between Truck Stops.

Chart performance (Curless's version)

References 

1970 songs
Dick Curless songs
Song recordings produced by George Richey
Songs written by George Vaughn Horton